The North Franklin Street Historic District is a U.S. historic district (designated as such on March 28, 2002) located in Tampa, Florida. The district is bounded by Florida Avenue, East Fortune, Tampa, Franklin and East Harrison Streets. It contains 8 historic buildings.

References

External links
 Hillsborough County listings at National Register of Historic Places
 North Franklin Street Historic District Map (Living Places.com)

National Register of Historic Places in Tampa, Florida
Historic districts on the National Register of Historic Places in Florida